Marjorie Gubelmann is a prominent socialite, philanthropist, TV personality and celebrity DJ.

Early life and education
Gubelmann was born in New York City, to Susan McCammon Gubelmann and William S. Gubelmann, and has one younger brother, Wyeth S. Gubelmann. Gubelmann’s great-grandfather was the inventor William S. Gubelmann, who held more than 5000 claims on patents, and was called “the father of all calculating machines in use today” by ‘’Popular Mechanics’’. In 1964 her grandfather Walter Gubelmann headed up the racing syndicate that successfully defended the America's Cup with the yacht Constellation.

Gubelmann attended New England College.

Business
Gubelmann's first job was at Licensing Management International, a London-based licensing firm. In 1995, she moved to New York City and worked for AmfAR in their Special Events/Major Gifts department. In 2004 Gubelmann started Vie Luxe International, a New York City-based company that produced scented candles. The firm manufactured candle lines for designers including Carolina Herrera, Calvin Klein and Oscar de la Renta, amongst others.

Society and Philanthropy
Gubelmann has been known as a society hostess and influential tastemaker. While living in New York City, Gubelmann has served as a chair or committee member for such organizations as The New York Botanical Garden, Memorial Sloan-Kettering Cancer Center, the Museum of Modern Art, ACRIA, AmfAR and God’s Love We Deliver. Gubelmann was a co-host with Cornelia Guest of Le Bar's grand opening at the Plaza Athénée in Paris; in 2006, she hosted the launch of “Les Perles de Chanel," Chanel’s luxurious new accoutrement capsule collection in New York City
Gubelmann is a front row regular in the fashion world, making appearances at both New York Fashion Week and Paris Fashion Week. She has been profiled in ‘’Vogue’’, ‘’Elle’’, Elle Decor,‘’W’’, ‘’Town & Country’’ and has also appeared on ‘’Vanity Fair’’’s International Best Dressed List. Gubelmann appeared in the 2002 season of “Single in the Hamptons”.

DJ MadMarj
Dubbed "The DJ With A Diamond Touch" by W Magazine, Gubelmann is a sought after TV, event and club DJ who performs under the name "DJ MadMarj". With a background as a radio disc jockey, Gubelmann is a graduate of the prestigious Scratch DJ Academy. MadMarj's DJ style includes contemporary music as well as multi-generational hit music from the 70s, 80s and 90s. Gubelmann has deejayed at events for W Magazine, Bulgari, Versace, Clinique, Saks Fifth Avenue, Bergdorf Goodman, Steven Meisel, American Ballet Theatre and Joe Fresh. Gubelmann has deejayed alongside Lil Jon and Rita Ora, among many other celebrity musicians. Gubelmann is represented by Doug Davis and Karrie Goldberg.

Gubelmann is currently the in-studio DJ for the Today With Hoda & Jenna show on NBC.

Personal life
In 2003, Gubelmann was married to Reza Raein in Palm Beach’s Episcopal Church of Bethesda-By-The-Sea. Wedding guests included Tory Burch, Michael Kors, Tamara Mellon and Ivanka Trump among many other society figures. Vanity Fair (magazine) called the Gubelmann wedding “the high-society event of [the] season.” Gubelmann and Raein were divorced in 2007.

Gubelmann lives on the Upper East Side of New York City.

References

External links
Madmarj.com

American women company founders
American company founders
American socialites
Businesspeople from New York City
1969 births
Living people
Club DJs
American electronic musicians
New England College alumni
21st-century American women